Kenneth Zane Beasley III (born June 4, 1974), known as Buddy Wakefield, is an American spoken word artist, a three-time poetry slam world champion, and the most toured performance poet in history. His works have been released by Strange Famous Records (CD), Righteous Babe Records (CD), and Write Bloody Publishing (books). He has lived in Sanborn, New York; Baytown, Texas; Seattle, Washington; Los Angeles, California; currently residing in Porto, Portugal.

Biography 

Buddy Wakefield (born Kenneth Zane Beasley III) was born in Shreveport, Louisiana, then raised in Sanborn, New York and Baytown, Texas. He was adopted by a stepfather in 1980 and became Buddy Marshall Stevens. After eighteen years of no contact, Buddy chose his own legal last name, Wakefield, from the Weezer song My Name is Jonas, thinking that the second half of the song began "My name is Wakefield. I've got a box full of your toys." He later discovered that Weezer's Rivers Cuomo was not saying Wakefield, but rather Wepeel, the name of Cuomo's sled from childhood.

In 2001, Buddy left his position as executive assistant at a biomedical firm in Gig Harbor, Washington, sold or gave away everything he owned, and moved into a Honda Civic to tour North American poetry venues.

In 2004, and again in 2005, he won the Individual World Poetry Slam Championship title, thanks to the support of anthropologist and producer Norman Lear. He was a member of several slam teams, including Team Long Beach in 2002, and Team Seattle in 2006 and 2007. Having not competed in poetry slam since 2008, he has gone on to build a significant following, and still considers performance poetry to be his day job while living in Los Angeles, and Porto, Portugal, pursuing acting and screenwriting for both television and film.

In addition to touring the world solo for two decades, Wakefield has also toured, performed with, headlined and opened for hip-hop, folk, and rock acts worldwide. As well, he was a core member of The Poetry Revival (2007-2010) with poets Derrick Brown, Anis Mojgani, Andrea Gibson and Cristin O'Keefe Aptowicz. As of 2019, Wakefield has performed in every state in the U.S. except North Dakota, on purpose, as a nod to his most streamed single, "Convenience Stores."

In 2020, Wakefield founded Awful Good Writers and produced Heavy Hitters Festival, a summer-long series of online performances and workshops with a lineup boasting 40+ of the most beloved living spoken word artists, including Saul Williams, Mary Lambert, Sarah Kay, Beau Sia, Rudy Francisco, Sonya Renee Taylor, Sage Francis and others.

Poetry, Performance, Books and Records 
Wakefield was the first author released on Write Bloody Publishing after its founder, Derrick C. Brown. He published five subsequent books with Write Bloody Publishing: Some They Can't Contain (2004, originally The Wordsmith Press; reissued by Write Bloody Publishing), Live for a Living (2007, Write Bloody Publishing), Gentleman Practice (2011, Write Bloody Publishing), Stunt Water: The Buddy Wakefield Reader 1991-2011 (2015, Write Bloody Publishing), and A Choir of Honest Killers (October 15, 2019, Write Bloody Publishing).

Wakefield also wrote and published a comical reference book with Stephen Snook, for backyard chicken keeping in urban and suburban environments: HENHOUSE: The International Book for Chickens and Their Lovers (2012, Write Bloody Publishing) 

Wakefield has released three full-length spoken word albums with best friend and producer Jon Berardi: A Stretch of Presence (1999) (co-produced with Levi Lyman), Run On Anything (2006) which was released by Strange Famous Records, and Live at the Typer Cannon Grand (2009) which was released by Ani DiFranco's Righteous Babe Records. DiFranco first became aware of Wakefield when her mother saw him perform at an art gallery in Buffalo, New York, and gave DiFranco a print out of Wakefield's website, saying, "You have to do something with this guy." The album contains recordings of live performances, including several from Wakefield's numerous tours opening for DiFranco, as well as one studio-produced track.

On January 31, 2021 all contracts with Write Bloody expired, making Wakefield the sole owner of his entire body of work.

Influence 

Though he has not competed in Poetry Slam since 2008, Wakefield has had a profound impact on the contemporary Poetry Slam movement, both in his performance and writing style, as well as how he has conducted his career. In her book, Words in Your Face: A Guided Tour Through Twenty Years of the New York City Poetry Slam, New York Times-bestselling author Cristin O'Keefe Aptowicz named Wakefield as "the modern poetry slam role model." She wrote,

Discography 
Live at the Typer Cannon Grand (Righteous Babe Records, 2009)  (CD),  (MP3)
Run On Anything (Strange Famous Records, 2006)  
A Stretch of Presence (Independently released, 1999) no ISBN

Bibliography 

A Choir of Honest Killers, Write Bloody Publishing, 2019 
Henhouse: The International Book for Chickens and Their Lovers, Write Bloody Publishing, 2012 
 Gentleman Practice, Write Bloody Publishing, 2011 
 Live for a Living, Write Bloody Publishing, 2007 
 Some They Can't Contain, The Wordsmith Press, 2004  
 Some They Can't Contain, Write Bloody Publishing, 2004 
Stunt Water: The Buddy Wakefield Reader 1991-2011, Write Bloody Publishing, 2015

Anthologies 
 Elephant Engine High Dive Revival, Write Bloody Publishing, 2008 
 Junkyard Ghost Revival, Write Bloody Publishing, 2008 
 The Last American Valentine: Illustrated poems to seduce and destroy, Write Bloody Publishing, 2008 
 Spoken Word Revolution Redux, Sourcebook, Inc, 2008 
 Solomon Sparrow's Electric Whale Revival, Write Bloody Publishing, 2007 
 Freedom to Speak: The Best of the 2002 National Poetry Slam, The Wordsmith Press, 2003

References

External links 

 Buddy Wakefield's Official Site
Voyage LA Interview with Buddy Wakefield
 Wakefield's Page on Righteous Babe Records website
 Audio of Wakefield's Poetry, as heard on Indiefeed Performance Poetry Podcast
 Poem: Information Man
 Poem: Human The Death Dance
 Preview for "The Drums Inside Your Chest" Poetry Concert Film featuring Wakefield
 Buddy Wakefield's Twitter Profile

Writers from Shreveport, Louisiana
Poets from Louisiana
American spoken word poets
Writers from Houston
1974 births
Living people
Slam poets
21st-century American poets